This is a list of notable faculty and alumni of Temple University, a comprehensive public research university in Philadelphia, Pennsylvania, USA.

Faculty

Russell Conwell – founder and first president of the university, author of Acres of Diamonds
Charles Ezra Beury – second president of the university
Robert Livingston Johnson – third president of the university
Millard E. Gladfelter – fourth president of the university
Paul R. Anderson – fifth president of the university
Marvin Wachman – sixth president of the university
Peter J. Liacouras – seventh president of the university
David Adamany – eighth president of the university
Ann Weaver Hart – ninth president of the university

Biology
Stephen Blair Hedges
Jody Hey
Masatoshi Nei

Communication
Joseph P. Folger

English

Samuel R. Delany – science fiction author
George W. Johnson – former chair of the Temple Department of English; later President of George Mason University (1979–1996)
Thomas Kinsella – Irish poet, translator, editor, and publisher; author of numerous volumes of poetry and a translation of the ancient Irish epic The Tain (Táin Bó Cúailnge); while at Temple, he developed a program for students to study in Ireland called "the Irish Experience"
Sonia Sanchez – poet
Miles Orvell – cultural historian, editor of the Encyclopedia of American Studies

Film
Lauren Wolkstein

History
Richard H. Immerman
Alan McPherson
David Alan Rosenberg
Gregory J. W. Urwin
Russell Weigley
Ralph F. Young

Law
Jim Drucker (born 1952/1953), former Commissioner of the Continental Basketball Association, former Commissioner of the Arena Football League, and founder of NewKadia Comics
C. Darnell Jones II
David Kairys
David G. Post

Mathematics

Emil Grosswald (1968–1980)
John Allen Paulos – author of Innumeracy: Mathematical Illiteracy and its Consequences

Music
Katherine Ciesinski
John Douglas – conductor and voice teacher; head of Temple's Opera Theatre program for two decades
Aaron Levinson – Grammy Award-winning producer and musician
Terell Stafford – Trumpet player

Philosophy
Lewis Gordon
Espen Hammer
Joseph Margolis
Jitendra Nath Mohanty, emeritus
Miriam Solomon – Professor of Philosophy

Psychology
Lauren Alloy
Laurence Steinberg
Joseph Wolpe – South African psychiatrist and founding figure in behavior therapy
Rinad Beidas

Religion
Ismail al-Faruqi
Michael Alexander
Edwin David Aponte
Leonard Swidler

Sociology
Annette Lareau

Sports
 Nikki Franke – fencer and fencing coach

Other disciplines
Molefi Asante – scholar, known for popularizing and developing Afrocentricity
Emile B. De Sauzé – language educator known for developing the conversational method of learning a language
Happy Fernandez – politician
Mary Stuart Fisher - radiologist
John E. Fryer – psychiatrist and gay rights activist, also known as Dr. Henry Anonymous
Jacob Gershon-Cohen – Professor of Research Radiology and developer of mammography for detecting breast cancer
Chevalier Jackson – pioneer physician in laryngology and endoscopy
Waldo Nelson – "father of pediatrics", longtime editor of The Journal of Pediatrics; author of Nelson Book of Pediatrics
Lucia V. Streng  – chemist
Ann M. Valentine – chemist
Earl Bradley – pediatrician
Mark L. Nelson – chemist and inventor of Nuzyra, an antibiotic FDA approved in 2018

Alumni

Academia

Rebecca Alpert – activist, Rabbi, and current chair of the religion department
Edwin David Aponte – author and educator, Vice President for Academic Affairs, Dean of the Faculty, and Professor of Christianity & Culture at Christian Theological Seminary, Indianapolis. 
Leon Bass (Ph.D.) – educator
John Baugh – linguist known for developing theory of linguistic profiling, Margaret Bush Wilson Professor in Arts and Sciences at Washington University in St. Louis
Susan H. Brandt - historian
David Bressoud (Ph.D) – mathematician, former professor at Pennsylvania State University, DeWitt Wallace Professor of Mathematics at Macalester College  
Noam Chomsky – linguist and activist, professor at Massachusetts Institute of Technology; as child attended Temple-run experimental Deweyite school, Oak Lane Day School
Linda Darling-Hammond – Charles E. Ducommun Professor of Education at the Stanford University Graduate School of Education, where she launched the School Redesign Network
Miguel A. De La Torre – Associate Professor of Social Ethics; Director of the Justice and Peace Institute at the Iliff School of Theology; author of several books concerning the marginalized
Angelo DiGeorge – physician and known for discovery of autoimmune disorder referred to as DiGeorge syndrome. Also, see Temple University School of Medicine, Notable Alumni and Pioneers
David Drasin – mathematician, specializing in function theory.
John Esposito – scholar of Middle East and Islamic studies, professor of International Affairs at Georgetown University
Louis Filler –  eminent professor of American Studies
Gail F. Forrest – spinal cord researcher at Kessler Foundation and New Jersey Medical School
Ben Goertzel – Chief Scientist of financial prediction firm Aidyia Holdings; Chairman of AI software company Novamente LLC
Stephen G. Haines – organizational theorist and management consultant
Thomas Anthony Harris – psychiatrist  and author of I'm OK, You're OK
Nathan Katz – former professor at Williams College, current Florida International University professor and expert on Jewish communities in India
Edmund Kornfeld – Organic chemist
Donald Kraybill – expert on Amish
Bill Mensch – computer scientist, founder, chairman and CEO of Western Design Center
Robert K. Merton – sociologist, former professor at Columbia University and Harvard University, former Chairman of the Department of Sociology at Tulane University
JoAnne Robbins – noted authority on dysphagia, professor at University of Wisconsin
Stephen Sheehi اسطفان شيحا – Sultan Qaboos bin Said Professor of Middle Eastern Studies, College of William and Mary; author of Foundations of Modern Arab Identity (University Press of Florida, 2004), Islamophobia: The Ideological Campaign Against Muslims (Clarity Press, 2011), and Arab Imago: A Social History of Portrait Photography 1860–1910, (Princeton University Press, 2016).
Shirley M. Tilghman – former professor and President of Princeton University
Martin A. Pomerantz – physicist, astronomer, Director of Bartol Research Institute, NASA Exceptional Scientific Achievement Medal and National Science Foundation's Distinguished Public Servant Award recipient
Alan Wolfe – political scientist and sociologist on the faculty of Boston College who serves as director of the Boisi Center for Religion and American Public Life. He is also a member of the Advisory Board of the Future of American Democracy Foundation, a nonprofit, nonpartisan foundation in partnership with Yale University Press and the Yale Center for International and Area Studies,[2] "dedicated to research and education aimed at renewing and sustaining the historic vision of American democracy".

Art

Laura Marie Greenwood – painter
Trenton Doyle Hancock – artist
Andrew Hussie – webcomic artist
Simmie Knox  – presidential portrait painter (Clinton)
Nicholas Muellner – photographer and writer
Ralph Rucci – designer
Paula Scher – designer
Sarai Sherman – artist
Aaron Shikler – presidential portrait painter
Jen Simmons – designer and web developer

Broadcasting

Al Alberts – singer, Philadelphia personality on WPVI-TV 
Bob Brinker – financial talk radio host for Citadel Media
Tony Bruno – sports radio talk show host on ESPN, Fox Sports Radio, and Sporting News Radio
Howard Bryant – senior writer for ESPN.com and ESPN The Magazine
Pat Callahan – host of This Week in Pro Football on 950 ESPN
Steve Capus –  president, NBC News
John Clark – sports anchorman for NBC 10 news
Fritz Coleman – weather anchor, KNBC-TV news
Tracy Davidson – news presenter for NBC 10 news
Jerry Del Colliano – radio/TV broadcaster, digital media expert, USC professor, author
Vince DeMentri – anchorman for NBC 10 news
Ray Didinger – award-winning sports journalist, NFL Hall of Famer writer.
Diplo – DJ/producer
Nick Gillespie – author, journalist, editor at reason.com
Tamron Hall – MSNBC anchor
Marc Lamont Hill – academic, journalist, author, activist, and television personality, Our World with Black Enterprise and online HuffPost Live host, BET News correspondent and a CNN political commentator.
John Kincade – sports radio talk show host on ESPN Radio
Mark Levin – conservative author, lawyer, and radio talk show host on WABC
Marty Moss-Coane – host, daily WHYY-FM local public radio show Radio Times
Hiro Muramoto – Japanese cameraman for Reuters, killed while covering the 2010 Thai political protests
Kevin Negandhi – ESPN anchor
Ronn Owens – radio talk show host
Ed Sciaky – disc jockey
Gene Shay – disc jockey
Terry Smith – broadcaster, Los Angeles Angels of Anaheim
Dyana Williams - Radio and television personality, journalist, and celebrity media coach
Marc Zumoff – sportscaster, Comcast Sportsnet, Philadelphia 76ers

Business
John Carrig – former COO and president for ConocoPhillips
Sam Greenblatt – vice president of technology and architecture in Enterprise Solution Group of Dell
Jai Gulati – CEO of Systel
Lewis Katz – businessman, philanthropist, newspaper publisher, former co-owner of The Philadelphia Inquirer
Larry Miller – president of Jordan Brand, former president of Portland Trail Blazers
Rosemary Reed Miller - owner Toast and Strawberries, Washington D.C. fashion boutique
Ash Vasudevan – founding Managing Partner of Edge Holdings

Film, theatre, and television

Bill Cosby – actor, comedian
Keith Andes – actor
Darcy Antonellis – major film studio executive
Joe Augustyn – screenwriter, producer
David Brenner – standup comedian, actor, author, filmmaker
Richard Brooks – Academy Award-winning Hollywood filmmaker
Cody Calafiore – model, actor, runner up of Big Brother 16, winner of Big Brother 22
Nicholas P. Dallis – soap comic writer
Norman Fell – comic actor best known for Three's Company (attended  Theatre Dept. classes)
Jason Winston George – actor, Sunset Beach, Platinum
Johnny Ray Gill – actor, independent filmmaker (NBC's Harry's Law)
William Goldenberg – Academy Award-winning Hollywood film editor
Veronica Hamel – actress, known for playing Joyce Davenport on the television series Hill Street Blues.
Lois Hamilton – actress
Tim Heidecker – comedian and co-creator of Tom Goes to the Mayor and Tim and Eric Awesome Show, Great Job!
Tigre Hill – film director/producer
Saba Homayoon – actress
Irvin Kershner – film director, Star Wars: Episode V – The Empire Strikes Back (1980)
Bruce Mailman – theatre producer and founder of The Saint
William Marchant – playwright and screenwriter
Adam McKay – Emmy-nominated director of Anchorman: The Legend of Ron Burgundy (2004), Talladega Nights: The Ballad of Ricky Bobby (2006), and Step Brothers (2008), Academy award-winning writer of The Big Short
Mary Lou Metzger – singer, dancer The Lawrence Welk Show
Kunal Nayyar – actor, plays  Raj on CBS's Big Bang Theory
Robert Prosky – actor 
Da'Vine Joy Randolph – Tony Award-nominated actress for Ghost the Musical
Herbert Rudley – actor
Bob Saget – comedian, game show host, Full House
Michael Schoeffling – actor who played Jake Ryan in 1980s film Sixteen Candles
Peter Shub – actor, clown, and circus producer
Svetlana Shusterman – from MTV's The Real World Key West
James Riordan – actor, Broadway, Television and Film actor
Tom Sizemore – actor
Hugh Panaro – actor, Broadway
Paul F. Tompkins – actor, comedian
Dan Trachtenberg – film director of 10 Cloverfield Lane, and co-host The Totally Rad Show
Eric Wareheim – comedian and co-creator of Tom Goes to the Mayor and Tim and Eric Awesome Show, Great Job!
Patricia Wettig – Emmy Award and Golden Globe Award-winning actress, thirtysomething, Brothers & Sisters, Prison Break
Jesse Williams – actor (Grey's Anatomy)
Danny Woodburn –  actor (Mickey on Seinfeld)
Colman Domingo – actor on Fear the Walking Dead
Quinta Brunson - actor, comedian

Government 

Mari Carmen Aponte – U.S. Ambassador to El Salvador
Edward J. Bonin – Republican U.S. Congressman for Pennsylvania
Frederick C. Branch – first African-American U.S. Marine Corps officer
Horace J. Bryant – first African American to serve in a State Cabinet position in New Jersey
Jamira Burley – Municipal leader, national campaign deputy director
Michael E. Busch – Speaker of the Maryland House of Delegates
Jim Cawley – Lt. Governor of Pennsylvania 
Robert Coughlin – longstanding Republican Pennsylvania representative to United States House of Representatives
Mae E. De Vincentis – former United States Department of Defense official and the vice director for the Defense Logistics Agency
Harold L. Ervin – judge on the Superior Court of Pennsylvania
Edwin Duing Eshleman – former Republican congressman
Thomas M. Foglietta – U.S. Congressman and United States Ambassador to Italy
Vincent Fumo – Democratic Pennsylvania state senator
Tom Gannon – Pennsylvania State Representative for the 161st legislative district (1979–2006)
Hage Geingob - President of the Republic of Namibia (March 21, 2015 – present)
Nikoloz Gilauri – Prime Minister of Georgia
Joseph M. Gladeck, Jr. (B.S. 1972) – Pennsylvania State Representative 1979–2000.
Camillo Gonsalves (BA in Journalism) – Permanent Representative of Saint Vincent and the Grenadines to the United Nations 
Theo-Ben Gurirab – President of the United Nations General Assembly, 1999–2000; Speaker of the National Assembly of Namibia since 2005
Stephen Hahn – Commissioner of the Food and Drug Administration
Joe Hoeffel – former Democratic congressman
Malcolm Hoenlein – executive vice chairman of the Conference of Presidents of Major American Jewish Organizations; founding executive director of the Greater New York Conference on Soviet Jewry and the Jewish Community Relations Council of New York
Vincent Hughes – Pennsylvania state senator (Democrat)
Zambry Abdul Kadir – current Menteri Besar of Perak, Malaysia, from political party UMNO
Kathleen Kane – first woman Attorney General of Pennsylvania, also convicted of felony perjury
Paul E. Kanjorski – U.S. Congressman, representing  Pennsylvania's 11th district
Guy Kratzer – Pennsylvania State Senator (1983-1986)
Jerome Kurtz – Commissioner of the Internal Revenue Service (1977–1980)
David See-Chai Lam OC, CVO, OBC, (林思齊) – 25th Lieutenant Governor of British Columbia, Canada
Joseph Lazarow – Mayor of Atlantic City, New Jersey, 1976–1982
Bryan Lentz – private attorney; former Pennsylvania State Representative for the 161st legislative district (2007–2010); Democratic nominee for U.S. Representative for 
 Joseph Melrose – former U.S. Ambassador to Sierra Leone, currently a professor at Ursinus College
Bernard T. Mittemeyer – lieutenant general and  former Surgeon General of the United States Army.
Francis J. Myers – former U.S. Senator and congressman, Pennsylvania
Joseph M. Pratt, U.S. congressman from Philadelphia (1944-1945)
R. K. Raghavan IPS – former Director of the Central Bureau of Investigation, India
Pallam Raju – Former Cabinet Minister of India for Human Resources Development
Charles W. Sandman, Jr. – represented , 1967–1975; unsuccessful candidate for Governor of New Jersey in 1973
Jim Saxton – U.S. Congressman representing 
Jacob Seidenberg - chairman of the Federal Services Impasses Panel 
Younes Sekkouri – Moroccan Minister of Economic Inclusion, Small Business, Employment and Skills 
Martin J. Silverstein – United States Ambassador to Uruguay
John F. Street – former Mayor of Philadelphia
Nao Takasugi – California State Assembly
Johnny Young – U.S. Ambassador to Slovenia (2001-2004), U.S. Ambassador to Bahrain (1997-2001), U.S. Ambassador to Togo (1994-1997), U.S. Ambassador to Sierra Leone (1989-1992)

Literature

Sharmi Albrechtsen – author, blogger
Ben Bova – science fiction author
Frank Brookhouser – Journalist, columnist, and author.
Jim Callahan – retired football player and writer
Tony Campolo – author, pastor, and speaker
Anita Cornwell – author
Eric Corey Freed – architect, author, public speaker
Jeffrey Gitomer – author, speaker, business trainer
David Goodis – crime fiction writer
Helene Hanff – writer
Tom McHale – novelist
Ted Polhemus – writer, photographer, anthropologist
Jeffrey Robinson – author
William Gardner Smith – author and journalist
Jerry Spinelli – writer
Lamont B. Steptoe – poet, photographer, publisher
Tony Trov – science fiction writer
Johnny Zito – science fiction writer

Music

Irving Berlin – honorary degree '54, songwriter
Rubén Colón Tarrats – orchestra director

 Norman Connors - Musician, Composer, Arranger, & Producer

Evelyn Simpson Curenton - composer
Diplo, born Thomas Wesley Pentz – DJ, producer, rapper, and songwriter
Alix Dobkin – singer/songwriter
Pat Finnerty – musician, guitarist, and songwriter
Joe Genaro – musician, guitarist and songwriter with the Dead Milkmen
Ariana Ghez – classic oboist
Julie Gold – songwriter, Grammy Award winner
Daryl Hall – musician
Marc-André Hamelin – pianist
Jared Hasselhoff – bassist in band The Bloodhound Gang
Mark Kramer – musician, producer-engineer, Mark Kramer Trio
Fred Mascherino – musician, Taking Back Sunday, Breaking Pangaea
Joe Masteroff – Tony Award-winning playwright
Bill McGlaughlin – composer, conductor, radio host of Exploring Music and Saint Paul Sunday
John Oates – musician
Eric Owens – opera singer
Billy Paul – Grammy Award winner and R&B singer, known for his number one single "Me and Mrs. Jones" and War of the Gods
James Poyser – Grammy Award winning keyboardist, songwriter, and producer
Fayette Pinkney – original member of The Three Degrees
Jimmy Pop – lead singer of The Bloodhound Gang
Jill Scott – R&B/soul artist
Debbie Sledge – Singer and member of the disco/R&B group Sister Sledge
Joni Sledge – Singer and member of the disco/R&B group Sister Sledge
Kathy Sledge – Singer and member of the disco/R&B group Sister Sledge
Kim Sledge – Singer and member of the disco/R&B group Sister Sledge
Allan Slutsky – Grammy Award-winning producer and musician
Jeffrey Solow – Grammy nominated classical cellist
Terell Stafford – professional jazz trumpet player
Tim – Korean ballad singer
Susan Werner – singer-songwriter

Other 

John C. Allen – roller coaster designer
Ted Bundy – serial killer
Reed Erickson - transgender activist, engineer, and philanthropist
Richard L. Fox - tax attorney
Judith E. Glaser – author and organizational anthropologist
E. Urner Goodman – early leader of the Boy Scouts of America
George E. Hargest – Noted philatelic and member of the American Philatelic Society Hall of Fame. 
Donniel Hartman – Israeli rabbi
Linda and Terry Jamison – "The Psychic Twins"
Steven Levy – writer for Wired and author of Hackers: Heroes of the Computer Revolution
Shantrelle P. Lewis – curator, historian, critic and filmmaker
Maralyn Lois Polak – journalist and author
Stephen Starr – celebrity restaurateur
John Thomas Taylor – congressional lobbyist for the American Legion
Salvatore Testa - Italian American hitman for the Philadelphia crime family
Michael van der Veen - attorney, who represented former President Donald Trump during his second impeachment trial
Diana Vincent – jewelry designer
James West, inventor, primarily of microphones
Edith Windsor – Plaintiff in United States v. Windsor

Sports

Baseball

Bobby Higginson – Major League Baseball player, Detroit Tigers
John Marzano – former MLB catcher; sports analyst
Harry Shuman – MLB player, Pittsburgh Pirates

Football

Robby Anderson – NFL wide receiver, New York Jets
Matt Balasavage – Former NFL tight end, Baltimore Ravens
Stan Batinski – NFL offensive guard, Detroit Lions
Todd Bowles – NFL Head Coach, New York Jets
Raheem Brock – NFL defensive end, Indianapolis Colts
Matt Brown
Lem Burnham – NFL defensive end, Philadelphia Eagles, did not play Temple, earned Ph.D at Temple
Jim Callahan –  former Continental Football League player and writer
Larry Chester – NFL defensive tackle, Miami Dolphins
Jim Cooper – NFL offensive tackle, Dallas Cowboys
Mike Curcio – NFL linebacker, Philadelphia Eagles and Green Bay Packers
Derek Dennis – American football offensive lineman
Randy Grossman – NFL tight end, Pittsburgh Steelers
Tom Hanson – NFL halfback, Philadelphia Eagles
James Harris – NFL defensive end, Oakland Raiders
Mike Jarmoluk – NFL defensive tackle, Philadelphia Eagles
Lance Johnstone – NFL defensive end, Minnesota Vikings
Alex Joseph – NFL linebacker, San Francisco 49ers
Bucko Kilroy – NFL defensive tackle, Philadelphia Eagles
Dan Klecko – NFL fullback, Philadelphia Eagles
Joe Klecko – NFL defensive tackle, New York Jets; father of Dan Klecko
Terrance Knighton – NFL defensive tackle, Denver Broncos
Bill Manlove, national championship college coach
Jason McKie – NFL fullback, Chicago Bears
Brandon McManus – NFL placekicker, Denver Broncos
Nick Mike-Mayer – NFL placekicker, Atlanta Falcons
James Nixon – NFL cornerback, Green Bay Packers
James Parrish – former professional football player
Bernard Pierce – NFL, running back, Jacksonville Jaguars
Britt Reid – former assistant coach in the NFL 
Kevin Ross – NFL cornerback, Kansas City Chiefs
Sarah Schkeeper – WFA Guard, New York Sharks
Leslie Shepherd – NFL wide receiver, Washington Redskins
Al Singleton – NFL linebacker, Dallas Cowboys
David Smukler (1914–1971)  NFL football player
Rod Streater –  NFL, wide receiver, Oakland Raiders
Rian Wallace – NFL linebacker, Pittsburgh Steelers
Steve Watson – NFL wide receiver, Denver Broncos
Muhammad Wilkerson – NFL defensive end, New York Jets
Tavon Young – NFL cornerback, Baltimore Ravens
Henry Burris – CFL quarterback, Ottawa Redblacks

Fencing

Kamali Thompson – Team USA fencer

Basketball

Lavoy Allen – NBA player, Indiana Pacers
Rick Brunson – NBA player, Philadelphia 76ers
Mardy Collins – NBA player, New York Knicks
Candice Dupree – WNBA player, Phoenix Mercury
Mel Greenberg – Women's Basketball Hall of Fame inductee, reporter for Philadelphia Inquirer
Marc Jackson – professional basketball player in Europe, former NBA player
Steve Javie – NBA referee
Eddie Jones – NBA player, Los Angeles Lakers, Miami Heat, Charlotte Hornets, Memphis Grizzlies, Dallas Mavericks
Mark Macon – NBA player, Denver Nuggets, Detroit Pistons
Aaron McKie – NBA player, Los Angeles Lakers, Philadelphia 76ers
Tim Perry – NBA player, Phoenix Suns, Philadelphia 76ers
Pepe Sánchez – former NBA player now with Spanish ACB; gold- medal winner  in basketball with Argentina, 2004 Summer Olympics
Khalif Wyatt (born 1991) – basketball player for Hapoel Holon of the Israeli Basketball Premier League

Other sports

Marcus McElhenney Olympian – Rowing at the 2008 Summer Olympics – Men's eight – bronze medal winner
Benny McLaughlin – National Soccer Hall of Fame
 Zach Pfeffer (born 1995) – soccer player
 Allen Rosenberg – rower and rowing coach
Jason Read – Olympic gold medalist, rowing
Eric Semborski – former NHL emergency Goaltender for the Chicago Blackhawks and Philadelphia Flyers
Gabe Sapolsky – professional wrestling booker, part founder of Ring of Honor and Full Impact Pro
Gil Stein – NHL commissioner of the National Hockey League, 1992–1993

Fictional alumni 

 Toby Flenderson – character in the television series The Office; has a degree in social work from Temple University

References

James Hilty, Temple University: 125 Years of Service to Philadelphia, the Region and the World (Philadelphia: Temple University Press, 2009).

Temple University people